Kembra Pfahler (born August 4, 1961 in Hermosa Beach, California, United States) is an American filmmaker, performance artist, visual artist, adjunct professor, rock musician, and film actress.

Her film work is associated with the movement known as the Cinema of Transgression. As a musician, she leads the band The Voluptuous Horror of Karen Black, who are inspired by glam, punk and shock rock. As a visual artist, Pfahler is known for self-portraits and for founding the art movement Availabilism. She co-authored "13 Tenets of Future Feminism". She has also been called the "godmother of modern day shock art".

Early life and education
Pfahler is the daughter of surfer Freddy Pfahler who had appeared in the 1958 surf film  Slippery When Wet, directed by Bruce Brown. Her brother is Adam Pfahler, the drummer of Jawbreaker. She grew up in Southern California. She went to college at the School of Visual Arts in New York and studied under Mary Heilmann and Lorraine O’Grady.

Actress
She appeared as a child actress in TV commercials for Kodak film. Later on, as a teenager, she moved to the East Coast of the United States and became involved in the 1980s East Village scene associated with ABC No Rio, when she began acting in low-budget films associated with the Cinema of Transgression. Pfahler stars alongside Jack Smith in Ari M. Roussimoff's Shadows in the City (1991). She appeared in the films Surf Gang (2006) and Gang Girls (2000), both directed by Katrina del Mar.

Model
During the 1980s, Pfahler worked as a Calvin Klein model, during an advertising campaign in the heroin chic style. She appeared as a model in the photographs accompanying the article "These Children that Come at You with Knives" written by Legs McNeil and Gillian McCain in a 1999 issue of Pop Smear Magazine. In this comic-book style layout depicting the Manson Family, Pfahler played Sharon Tate alongside Maynard James Keenan as Charles Manson.

In fall 2019, Pfahler walked in the Mugler Spring 2020 Ready-to-Wear fashion show. She has also modeled for Rick Owens, Rodarte, Marc Jacobs, and Helmut Lang.

Music
In 1990, Pfahler and Samoa Moriki, her husband at the time, founded the band The Voluptuous Horror of Karen Black on the Lower East Side of New York City. The band was named in homage to actress Karen Black. They released three albums: A National Healthcare (1993); Anti-Naturalists (1995);  and Black Date (1998); as well as several limited-edition presses on vinyl.

Pfahler and Samoa shot many horror films and used visual and performance art for their performances. VHOKB's live performance of The Wall of Vagina appears on Disinformation DVD - The Complete Series. VHOKB also appear on the album Virgin Voices: A Tribute to Madonna.

Pfahler sang backup on the song "Shoot, Knife, Strangle, Beat and Crucify" on the album Brutality and Bloodshed for All of GG Allin and the Murder Junkies.

In 2013, she covered the traditional "Barnacle Bill the Sailor" for the sea shanty compilation Son of Rogues Gallery: Pirate Ballads, Sea Songs & Chanteys.

Visual and Performance Art 
Hans Ulrich Obrist described Pfahler as a 'pioneer' of the Cinema of Transgression and of performance art and 'pioneering' as a musician and actress, and has called her interdisciplinary practice a 'Gesamtkunstwerk.' 

Pfahler has shown work at the Museum of Contemporary Art in Rome, The Garage Museum of Contemporary Art in Moscow, Deitch Projects, The Hole Gallery in New York, Bowman Gallery, and Kenny Schachter Rove Gallery, in London. Her drawings are in the permanent collection of the Museum of Modern Art in New York.

Pfahler, while in Europe, discovered and took inspiration from the Viennese Actionism movement, specifically Rudolf Schwarzkogler. Her performances have included the cracking of paint-filled eggs on her vulva. In 1984, she performed in XS: The Opera Opus when it was presented at the Pyramid Club. She created solo performances in the 1980s at ABC No Rio. In a performance piece shown in Richard Kern’s Sewing Circle (1992), Pfhaler had her vagina sewn shut by artist Lisa Resurreccion while only wearing a “Young Republicans” t-shirt.

In a 2005 Pfahler held a solo exhibition at Rove Projects in London. The exhibition, titled "File Under V", consisted of self-portraits, performance documentation, and band props from Voluptuous Horror. In January 2007, Pfahler, with Julie Atlas Muz, curated a mixed-media art exhibition titled Womanizer at Deitch Projects. The show included works by E.V. Day, Breyer P-Orridge, Vaginal Davis, and burlesque performer Bambi the Mermaid. Her contribution was an installation with a bed set that contained a skeleton and dolls painted in multiple colors, surrounded by walls plastered with red paste, as well as a video that shows her ripping the dolls out of a birthing canal. As part of the 2008 Whitney Biennial and with support from the Art Production Fund, Pfahler and Voluptuous Horror gave a performance in the Park Avenue Armory's Drill Hall on 14 March 2008. These performances included her works Actressocracy and Whitney Live. 

In 2009 alongside gallerist Kathy Grason, Pfhaler published a photographic catalog of her work in the form of a book titled Beautalism .

She was interviewed in 2011, as part of the documentary The Advocate for Fagdom by Angélique Bosio about queercore filmmaker Bruce La Bruce,

In 2019, Pfahler played a rock in Anohni's play SHE WHO SAW BEAUTIFUL THINGS at The Kitchen, alongside her teacher Lorraine O'Grady as well as Laurie Anderson and Charles Atlas.

Availabilism 
Pfahler founded the art movements and conceptual philosophies of Availabilism (sometimes written as 'availabism'), using what is closest at hand ("available") as both the inspiration for her work and the medium of her expression. Availabilism is associated with punk and DIY movements, Pfahler has defined it as:"Availabilism is making the best use of what’s available. It has a basis in finance and commerce, although if there is money available to be used it will be used. It’s not a celebration of poverty, but of abundance. It’s having the willingness to be an interdisciplinary artist. In my case, performance was about using the available tools that I had, which was my body and one of my first performances, the egg piece, it was having one egg in the refrigerator."Pfahler teaches students in how to use Availabilism through her workshops 'Performance Art 101,' which she has delivered regularly over the past two decades in New York City's East Village as well as venues including Pioneer Works and The Watermill Center. Pfahler has also taught at Bard College.

Other terminologies 
Pfahler has often used word-play and portmanteaus to describe areas of her practice these include: Anti-Naturalism, to describe an aesthetic of total artificiality; Beautalism, to describe making beauty out of brutal real-life circumstances; and Yesterbating, as a critical description of nostalgia.

Future Feminism 
In 2011, Pfahler co-created Future Feminism alongside Anohni, Bianca and Sierra Cassidy (of CocoRosie), and Johanna Constantine. The group of five women stated that their aim with the project is a "a "call to arms to reorganize ourselves as a species and affirm archetypally feminine values." Their first group show debuted in 2014 at The Hole in New York City, most prominently featuring 13 large rose-quartz discs, each engraved with a 'tenet' of Future Feminism including: '1. The subjugation of women and the earth is one in the same,' '2. Future Feminism requires the participation of all people.' and '13. The future is female.' 

The 2014 exhibition at The Hole included 13 events from various feminist artists including Marina Abramović, Carolee Schneemann, Kiki Smith, Laurie Anderson, Terence Koh, Lydia Lunch, Narcissister and Viva Ruiz. The show was re-staged at the 'O' Space gallery in Aarhus, Denmark as part of the 2017 European Capital of Culture and featured a series of debates, presentations, performances and workshops.

The group is credited with popularising the slogan 'the future is female' from 2014 onwards, which was then marketed by t-shirt companies and used by Hilary Clinton in a 2017 speech.

References

External links

DisinfoTV: The Voluptuous Horror of Kembra Pfahler
The Voluptuous Horror of Karen Black: Bring Back the Night, The Guardian, 31 July 2012
Kembra singing backup vocals for GG Allin's Shoot, Knife, Strangle, Beat & Crucify at Don Fury Studio 4/23/93

Living people
Women punk rock singers
Singers from California
American performance artists
1961 births
American experimental musicians
American industrial musicians
American women singers
American rock singers
21st-century American women